is a female Japanese light novelist from Kōchi, Japan.

Biography
Arikawa was born on June 9, 1972 in Kochi City, Kochi Prefecture, Japan. She won the tenth annual Dengeki Novel Prize for new writers for Shio no Machi: Wish on My Precious in 2003, and the book was published the following year. It was praised for its love story between a heroine and hero divided by age and social status, and for its depiction of military structures.

Although she is a light novelist, her books from her second work onwards have been published as hardbacks alongside more literary works, with Arikawa receiving special treatment in this respect from her publisher, MediaWorks. Shio no Machi was also later published in hardback. Her 2006 light novel Toshokan Sensō (The Library War) was named as Hon no Zasshi'''s number one for entertainment for the first half of 2006, and came fifth in the Honya Taishō for that year, competing against ordinary novels.

She has written about the Japan Self-Defense Forces (JSDF); her first three novels concerning its three branches are known as the Jieitai Sanbusaku (The SDF Trilogy). She also wrote about the fictional Library Forces in the Toshokan Sensō series. Raintree no Kuni, which first appeared as a book within a book in Toshokan Nairan was later published by Arikawa as a spin-off with another publisher. It was adapted into a film titled World of Delight released on November 21, 2015.

Her novel   was adapted into a film titled Shokubutsu Zukan: Unmei no Koi, Hiroimashita (Evergreen Love), released on June 4, 2016. Likewise, two other of her novels, i.e. Freeter, Ie wo Kau and Hankyū Densha were adapted respectively in film or TV series in 2010 and 2011.Tabineko Ripouto, a work which was serialized Weekly Bunshun between the years of 2011-2012, was compiled into a novel in 2012. In it, the protagonist is a cat called Nana (Japanese for seven), which enters the life of cat lover Satoru, who is still mourning his first cat Hachi (Japanese for eight). Tabineko Ripouto rapidly gained critical acclaim and several literary award nominations. It was translated by Philip Gabriel and published in English as The Travelling Cat Chronicles in 2017. The novel was then adapted into a film in 2018.

 Influence 
In a 2011 essay written by video game designer Hideo Kojima, he reviewed Arikawa's novel Hankyu Densha while relating the story to his personal experiences riding the Hankyu Railway as a child. The essay was later published in Kojima's autobiographical book The Creative Gene, released on October 12, 2021.

WorksThe SDF Trilogy seriesShio no Machi: Wish on My Precious  Sora no NakaUmi no SokoThe Library War seriesToshokan Sensō (The Library War)Toshokan Nairan (The Library Infighting)Toshokan Kiki (The Library Crisis)Toshokan Kakumei (The Library Revolution)Raintree no KuniSweet Blue AgeHankyū Densha (published in French in 2021 under the title Au prochain arrêt, i.e. At the next stop).Freeter, Ie wo KauSoratobu KōhōshitsuTabineko Ripouto (published in English under the title The Travelling Cat Chronicles'' in 2017)

References

External links

1972 births
Living people
People from Kōchi Prefecture
Writers from Kōchi Prefecture
Japanese women novelists
21st-century Japanese women writers
Light novelists
21st-century Japanese novelists
Japan Self-Defense Forces in fiction